Sea Princess Azuri is an original English manga distributed by Tokyopop and created by Erica Reis (now married and publishing under the name Erica Leigh Currey). It is the story of Azuri, an Orcan (human/orca hybrid) bethrothed to Prince Unagi, the leader of Eels, as part of a peace offering. Things complicate, however, when she falls in love with Thalo, her Orcan guard and childhood best friend.

Plot
Azuri is to marry Unagi, and despite Thalo's efforts to remain indifferent, Thalo isn't happy. He does, however, "stand by" while the Eel Prince courts the Orcan Princess, all the while he and Azuri try to convince themselves that they are not actually in love. At the ball to celebrate Unagi's arrival to the kingdom of Orca, Azuri performs an ancient Orcan Bridal Ritual. With her Breath Blast Attack, she shatters the ceremonial ice platform on which she danced with a single note.

In Volume 2, things heat up as Prince Unagi notices the sweet nothings that Princess Azuri and Thalo are unable to hide. He sets in motion a plan to drive Thalo out of the kingdom, by setting him up to take the fall for crimes the young Orcan didn't commit. His servant Scample sabotages the Great Ballroom to collapse in on itself while Thalo and Azuri are on top of it, so that Thalo will take the blame.

In Volume 3 (never published), Unagi's real reasons for setting up the marriage between himself and Princess Azuri become clear. He intends to marry the princess and murder the queen, thereby assuming rule of both kingdoms. Azuri finds out and runs away before they can be married, stalling his plan. She seeks out Thalo, who was turned into a human and banished from the kingdom to live on land—a cruel joke to any mer-person.

Characters
Princess Azuri
The "Pale Princess," only daughter of Queen Onyxis, and next in line for the throne to the powerful Kingdom of Orca.

Prince Unagi
Son of King Anago, the first king of the Eels, Prince Unagi is heir to the kingdom of Gillenok.

Queen Onyxis
Current queen of the great Orcan people, Queen Onyxis is wise, intelligent, and independent. Princess Azuri's mom ...

Thalo
A talented young Orcan who has a passion for aquatic martial arts ... and Princess Azuri!

Mica
Thalo's best friend from the Martial Academy.

Awa
Awa was orphaned at a young age when her parents were killed by a Jellysquid. She's a Sealicorn and Azuri's faithful pet.

Scample
A young four-armed shrimp mermaid, Scample is Unagi's faithful servant (and #1 fan).

Cinnabelle
One of Azuri's chambermaids, cool and aloof. She is a squid mermaid.

Gibbi
Gibbi is one of the many merfolk immigrants in the Orcan kingdom. She's always there to counsel and encourage Azuri when she's feeling down. She is a catfish mermaid, complete with cat ears.

The Coral Sisters
The Coral Sisters are a guarded secret of the Orcan monarchy. They are essentially one being: three bodies connected to the bottom of a large round coral. They possess abilities handed down by the gods to create and manipulate DNA, and are the foundation upon which the entire Orcan scientific knowledge is built.

References

External links
Official Sea Princess Azuri Website
Erica's Portfolio Page | Sugar Pencil
Erica's Deviant Art page
Tokyopop page (defunct)
Madman Entertainment's Official Sea Princess Azuri Website

Fantasy comics
Tokyopop titles
2006 comics debuts